This is a list of drag queens, sometimes known as female impersonators, drag performers, or drag artists.

Performers

See also 
 List of RuPaul's Drag Race contestants
 List of exóticos

References

External links
 List of Drag Queens/Drag Performers at draglistings.com

Drag (clothing)-related lists
queens